Opisthoplatia is a genus of cockroaches in the family Blaberidae. There are at least two described species in Opisthoplatia, found in south and east Asia, and Indomalaya.

The genus was monotypic until a species from the Philippines, Opisthoplatia beybienkoi, was described in 2005.

Species
These two species belong to the genus Opisthoplatia:
 Opisthoplatia beybienkoi Anisyutkin, 2005
 Opisthoplatia orientalis (Burmeister, 1838) (amphibious litter roach)

References

External links

 

Cockroaches